Tom Aspinall (11 April 1993) is an English professional mixed martial artist. He currently competes in the Heavyweight division in the Ultimate Fighting Championship (UFC). As of 13 March 2023, he is #5 in the UFC heavyweight rankings.

Background
Aspinall followed his father's footsteps by beginning to train martial arts at the age of seven. After also training wrestling and boxing, Aspinall transitioned to Brazilian jiu-jitsu. He has won the British Open in Brazilian jiu-jitsu in all belt classes except black belt. After his father became the jiu-jitsu instructor of Team Kaobon, Aspinall grew interested in mixed martial arts and eventually transitioned into the sport.

Mixed martial arts career

Early career
Aspinall signed a five-fight contract with Cage Warriors after 2.5-year hiatus from professional mixed martial arts. Aspinall was offered a contract by the Ultimate Fighting Championship also, but did not feel ready for the organization and subsequently turned it down. After two fast finishes in Cage Warriors he eventually signed to the UFC.

Ultimate Fighting Championship
Aspinall was originally scheduled to make his promotional debut against Raphael Pessoa at UFC Fight Night: Woodley vs. Edwards on March 21, 2020. However, Pessoa withdrew from the bout citing an injury and was replaced by Jake Collier, but this event was cancelled due to the COVID-19 pandemic. Subsequently, the pairing was left intact and took place on July 25, 2020 at UFC on ESPN 14. He won the fight via technical knockout in round one. This win earned him the Performance of the Night award.

Aspinall's second UFC appearance was expected to be against Sergey Spivak at UFC Fight Night: Moraes vs. Sandhagen on October 11, 2020. However, Spivak withdrew from the bout for undisclosed reasons and he was replaced by promotional newcomer Alan Baudot. Aspinall won the fight via first-round technical knockout.

Aspinall next faced Andrei Arlovski at UFC Fight Night: Blaydes vs. Lewis on February 20, 2021. He won the fight via a submission in round two. This win earned him the Performance of the Night award.

Aspinall was expected to face Sergei Pavlovich on September 4, 2021 at UFC Fight Night 191. However, Pavlovich was removed from the card in late-August due to alleged visa issues which restricted his ability to travel and was replaced by Sergey Spivak. Aspinall won the fight via technical knockout in round one. The win earned Aspinall his third Performance of the Night bonus award.

Aspinall was scheduled to face Shamil Abdurakhimov on March 19, 2022 at UFC Fight Night 204. However, on January 21, 2022, it was announced that Aspinall would instead face Alexander Volkov. Aspinall won the fight via straight armbar submission in round one. With this win, he received the Performance of the Night award.

Aspinall faced Curtis Blaydes on July 23, 2022, at UFC Fight Night 208. He lost the fight by technical knockout 15 seconds into the first round after being rendered unable to continue due to a knee injury.

Championships and accomplishments

Mixed martial arts
 Ultimate Fighting Championship
 Performance of the Night (Four times)

Mixed martial arts record

|-
|Loss
|align=center|12–3
|Curtis Blaydes
|TKO (knee injury)
|UFC Fight Night: Blaydes vs. Aspinall 
|
|align=center|1
|align=center|0:15
|London, England
|
|-
|Win
|align=center|12–2
|Alexander Volkov
|Submission (straight armbar)
|UFC Fight Night: Volkov vs. Aspinall
|
|align=center|1
|align=center|3:45
|London, England
|
|-
|Win
|align=center|11–2
|Sergey Spivak
|TKO (elbow and punches)
|UFC Fight Night: Brunson vs. Till 
|
|align=center|1
|align=center|2:30
|Las Vegas, Nevada, United States
|
|-
|Win
|align=center|10–2
|Andrei Arlovski
|Submission (rear-naked choke)
|UFC Fight Night: Blaydes vs. Lewis
|
|align=center|2
|align=center|1:09
|Las Vegas, Nevada, United States
|
|-
|Win
|align=center|9–2
|Alan Baudot
|TKO (elbows and punches)
|UFC Fight Night: Moraes vs. Sandhagen
|
|align=center|1
|align=center|1:35
|Abu Dhabi, United Arab Emirates
|
|-
|Win
|align=center|8–2
|Jake Collier
|TKO (knee and punches)
|UFC on ESPN: Whittaker vs. Till 
|
|align=center|1
|align=center|0:45
|Abu Dhabi, United Arab Emirates
|
|-
|Win
|align=center| 7–2
|Mickael Ben Hamouda
|TKO (punches)
|Cage Warriors 107
|
|align=center|1
|align=center|0:56
|Liverpool, England
|
|-
| Win
|align=center| 6–2
|Sofiane Boukichou
|TKO (leg injury)
|Cage Warriors 101
|
|align=center|1
|align=center|1:21
|Liverpool, England
|
|-
| Win
|align=center| 5–2
|Kamil Bazelak
|KO (punch)
|Full Contact Contender 16
|
|align=center| 1
|align=center| 1:16
|Bolton, England
|
|-
| Loss
|align=center| 4–2
|Łukasz Parobiec
| DQ (illegal downward elbow)
|BAMMA 25
|
|align=center|2
|align=center|3:33
|Birmingham, England
|
|-
| Win
|align=center| 4–1
|Adrian Ruskac
| TKO (punches)
|Full Contact Contender 15
|
|align=center|1
|align=center|1:05
|Bolton, England
|
|-
|Loss
|align=center| 3–1
|Stuart Austin
|Submission (heel hook)
|BAMMA 21
|
|align=center|2
|align=center|3:59
|Birmingham, England
|
|-
| Win
|align=center| 3–0
|Satisch Jhamai
| TKO (punches)
|BAMMA 19
|
|align=center|1
|align=center|0:09
|Blackpool, England
|
|-
|Win
|align=center| 2–0
|Ricky King
|Submission (heel hook)
|BAMMA 18
|
|align=center|1
|align=center|0:49
|Wolverhampton, England
|
|-
| Win
|align=center| 1–0
|Michał Piszczek
|TKO (submission to punches)
|MMA Versus UK
|
|align=center|1
|align=center|0:15
|Manchester, England
|
|-

Professional boxing record

Publications and other media 
Tom features and narrates in Coach Mike Chadwick's The Red On Revolution book, published in 2022.

See also

 List of current UFC fighters
 List of male mixed martial artists

References

External links
 
 

Year of birth missing (living people)
English practitioners of Brazilian jiu-jitsu
Heavyweight mixed martial artists
Mixed martial artists utilizing Brazilian jiu-jitsu
English male mixed martial artists
Ultimate Fighting Championship male fighters
Living people
Sportspeople from Wigan
People awarded a black belt in Brazilian jiu-jitsu